The Merchant of Venice is a play by William Shakespeare.

The Merchant of Venice may also refer to:

The Merchant of Venice (1914 film), a lost American silent film
The Merchant of Venice (1916 film), a British silent film
The Merchant of Venice (1923 film), a German silent film
The Merchant of Venice (1953 film), a French-Italian drama
The Merchant of Venice (1961 film), an Australian TV film
The Merchant of Venice (1969 film), a partially lost American film
The Merchant of Venice (1980 film), a TV film for season three of BBC Television Shakespeare
The Merchant of Venice (2004 film), American film
The Merchant of Venice (opera), by André Tchaikowsky

See also
The Maori Merchant of Venice, a 2002 New Zealand film
Merchant of Venus, board game
The Merchants of Venus, science fiction novel by Frederik Pohl
Rainbow Prelude, which contains a manga version of The Merchant of Venice